Laetitia Juliëtte Griffith (born 1 November 1965) is a retired Surinamese–born Dutch politician of the People's Party for Freedom and Democracy (VVD) and jurist.

Career
Born in Paramaribo, Suriname, Griffith moved to the Netherlands in 1987 to study law. She graduated in 1992 from the VU University Amsterdam. In 1993 she started work at the Ministry of Justice.

In 2000 Griffith joined the People's Party for Freedom and Democracy after being advised to do so by Minister Benk Korthals. After the fall of the First Balkenende cabinet she became a member of the House of Representatives. On 16 May 2005 she became an alderman in the Amsterdam municipal council.

On 19 May 2006 it was announced that Griffith would succeed Ayaan Hirsi Ali as parliamentarian. On 15 March 2010 she announced her retreat from politics. In 2012 she became a member of the Council of State.

Decorations

References

External links

Official
  Mr. L.J. (Laetitia) Griffith Parlement & Politiek

 
 

1965 births
Living people
Aldermen of Amsterdam
Dutch nonprofit directors
Dutch nonprofit executives
Dutch women jurists
Knights of the Order of Orange-Nassau
Members of the Council of State (Netherlands)
Members of the House of Representatives (Netherlands)
Municipal councillors of Amsterdam
People from Paramaribo
People's Party for Freedom and Democracy politicians
Surinamese emigrants to the Netherlands
Vrije Universiteit Amsterdam alumni
20th-century Dutch civil servants
21st-century Dutch civil servants
21st-century Dutch women politicians
21st-century Dutch politicians
20th-century Dutch women